The following is a timeline of minor events between January and mid-March in the COVID-19 pandemic in Sweden. Further data has been published here.

Timeline

Case list

References

COVID-19 pandemic in Sweden
Sweden